The 2002 Western Illinois Leathernecks football team represented Western Illinois University as a member of the Gateway Football Conference during the 2002 NCAA Division I-AA football season. They were led by fourth-year head coach Don Patterson and played their home games at Hanson Field. The Leathernecks finished the season with an 11–2 record overall and a 6–1 record in conference play, making them conference co-champions. The team received an automatic bid to the NCAA Division I-AA Football Championship playoffs, where they defeated Eastern Illinois in the first round and lost to Western Kentucky in the quarterfinal. The team was ranked No. 5 in The Sports Network's postseason ranking of Division I-AA.

Schedule

References

Western Illinois
Western Illinois Leathernecks football seasons
Missouri Valley Football Conference champion seasons
Western Illinois Leathernecks football